Bryan C. Hassel is an expert on education issues, co-director of Public Impact a national education policy and management consulting firm based in Chapel Hill, North Carolina, and co-founder of the national Opportunity Culture initiative.   Hassel received his doctorate in public policy from Harvard University and his masters in politics from Oxford University, which he attended as a Rhodes Scholar. He earned his B.A. at the University of North Carolina at Chapel Hill, which he attended as a Morehead Scholar.

Major work 

In addition to numerous articles, monographs, and how-to guides for practitioners, he is the co-author with Emily Ayscue Hassel of "Picky Parent Guide: Choose Your Child's School with Confidence" and author of "The Charter School Challenge: Avoiding the Pitfalls, Fulfilling the Promise," published by the Brookings Institution Press in 1999.

Books
Hassel, Bryan C. The Charter School Challenge: Avoiding the Pitfalls, Fulfilling the Promise. Washington, D.C.: Brookings Institution Press, 1999.
Peterson, Paul E., and Bryan C. Hassel. Learning from School Choice. Washington, D.C.: Brookings Institution Press, 1998.
Hassel, Bryan C., and Emily Ayscue Hassel. Picky Parent Guide : Choose Your Child's School with Confidence: The Elementary Years, (K-6). Ross, CA: Armchair Press, 2004.
 Hassel, Bryan C., and Emily Ayscue Hassel. Choose Your Child's School with Confidence: The Elementary Years, K-6. Picky parent guide. Ross, CA: Armchair Press, 2004.

References

External links 
Public Impact
Education Sector

Living people
Alumni of Balliol College, Oxford
Harvard Kennedy School alumni
Year of birth missing (living people)
American Rhodes Scholars
University of North Carolina at Chapel Hill alumni